The Francis Scott Key Bridge, also known originally as the Outer Harbor Crossing (until renamed for FSK in 1977) or simply as the Key Bridge or Beltway Bridge, is a steel arch-shaped continuous through truss bridge spanning the lower Patapsco River and outer Baltimore Harbor / Port in Baltimore, Maryland, United States. It is also the longest bridge in the Baltimore metropolitan area.

The bridge was opened in March 1977 and is named for the author of the American national anthem, the poem originally called "The Defence of Fort McHenry" written in September 1814 and later set to music and entitled the "Star Spangled Banner" by   Frederick and Georgetown lawyer /amateur poet Francis Scott Key (1779–1843). The bridge is the outermost of three toll crossings of Baltimore's Harbor (two tunnels and one bridge). Upon completion, the bridge structure and its approaches became the final links in Interstate 695 (the "Baltimore Beltway"), completing a two decades long project.  Despite the I-695 signage, the bridge is officially considered part of the state highway system and designated Maryland Route 695.

It is a designated hazardous materials truck route, as HAZMATs are prohibited in the Baltimore Harbor and Fort McHenry tunnels.

The Key Bridge is a toll facility operated by the Maryland Transportation Authority (MDTA). The toll rate for cars as of July 1, 2013 is $4.00.  The bridge is also part of the E-ZPass system, and includes two dedicated E-ZPass lanes in its toll plaza in both the northbound and southbound directions. In April 2019, MDTA announced that the bridge will become a cashless toll facility by October 2019. With this system, customers without E-ZPass pay using video tolling. Cashless tolling began on the bridge on October 30, 2019.

Background
In the 1960s, the old Maryland State Roads Commission concluded there was a need for a second harbor crossing after the earlier Baltimore Harbor Thruway and Tunnel opened in 1957 and began planning another single-tube tunnel under the Patapsco River, further to the southeast, downstream from the Baltimore Harbor Tunnel. The proposed site was between Hawkins Point and Sollers Point in the outer harbor. Plans also were underway for a drawbridge to the south over Curtis Creek (replacing an earlier 1931 drawbridge carrying Pennington Avenue over the creek) to connect Hawkins Point to Sollers Point. (At the same time, a bridge was planned for the segment of an additional through highway for the East Coast with I-95 that would run through the city near Fort McHenry and paralleling the now two decades old Harbor Tunnel Thruway; this was replaced by what is now known as the Fort McHenry Tunnel, a major expensive project four-tube facility running under and curving around historic 1798 Fort McHenry that opened in 1985).

Contractors took bearings of the outer harbor bottom and ship channel in the spring of 1969. Bids for construction of the proposed tunnel were opened on July 30, 1970, but price proposals were substantially higher than the engineering estimates. Officials drafted alternative plans, including the concept of a four-lane bridge.

The bridge, at an estimated cost of $110 (USD) million, represented the best alternative because it allowed for more traffic lanes and carried lower operating and maintenance costs than a tunnel. In addition, a bridge would provide a route across the Baltimore Harbor for vehicles transporting hazardous materials (these materials are prohibited from both the Baltimore Harbor and Fort McHenry tunnels).

Construction began in 1972, and the bridge opened to traffic on March 23, 1977. Other structures along the thruway include a  dual-span drawbridge over Curtis Creek and two  parallel bridge structures that carry traffic over Bear Creek, near the former Bethlehem Steel Sparrows Point plant, this portion of the project not being fully complete until the late 1990s.

Located in an area rich with American history, scholars believe the span crosses within  of the site, marked in the water off the bridge by a red-white-blue buoy with stars and stripes painted on it, where Francis Scott Key, held aboard an American truce ship with the British Royal Navy fleet witnessed the bombardment of Fort McHenry on the days and nights of September 12-13-14, 1814.  That battle and bombardment inspired Key to write the words of the Star Spangled Banner. Located just southeast of the bridge and adjacent underneath are the ruins of the island shoals of Sollers Flats with Fort Carroll, begun building in the 1840s under the supervision of United States Army Corps of Engineers, then Col. Robert E. Lee.

There is another bridge called the Francis Scott Key Bridge, located in Washington, DC on US 29.  It crosses the Potomac River, and links the District in Georgetown on the north shore to Reston and Arlington, Virginia to the south.

References

External links

Maryland Transportation Authority, Francis Scott Key Bridge website
Steve Anderson's DCroads.net: Francis Scott Key Bridge (I-695)

Crossings of the Patapsco River
Transportation buildings and structures in Baltimore
Toll bridges in Maryland
Bridges completed in 1977
Tolled sections of Interstate Highways
Interstate 95
Continuous truss bridges in the United States
Road bridges in Maryland
Bridges on the Interstate Highway System
Steel bridges in the United States
1977 establishments in Maryland